Eija-Elina Anneli Bergholm (née Neuvonen, born 27 April 1943) is a Finnish director and screenwriter.

Life and career 
Born in Lahti, Bergholm studied art history and drama at the University of Helsinki and drama at the Finnish Theater Institute, graduating in 1965. She started her career working as a television director  and serving as artistic director for the Helsinki Student Theatre. She made her film debut as a screenwriter in 1968, with the critical acclaimed Punahilkka directed by her first husband , which was followed one year later by the controversial but commercially successful Jörn Donner's film Anna.

Beyond her work for cinema, in her home country she is also well known for the television works she wrote and directed for the Finnish Broadcasting Company from the late 1970s.

References

External links
 

1943 births
Living people
People from Lahti
Finnish screenwriters
Finnish television directors
Finnish film directors
University of Helsinki alumni
Finnish women screenwriters